Los Lobos is a census-designated place (CDP) in Zapata County, Texas, United States. This was a new CDP for the 2010 census with a population of 9.

Geography
Los Lobos is located at  (26.606536, -99.161264).

References

Census-designated places in Zapata County, Texas
Census-designated places in Texas